The fundamental principle of bass management (also called LFE crossover) in surround sound replay systems is that bass content in the incoming signal, irrespective of channel, should be directed only to loudspeakers capable of reproducing it, whether the latter are the main system loudspeakers or one or more subwoofers.

Mapping

There are notation differences between the pre-bass-managed signal and after it has passed through the bass manager. For example, when using 5.1 surround sound:

As the table shows, the bass manager directs bass frequencies from all channels to one or more subwoofers, not just the content of the low-frequency effects (LFE) channel. However, when there is no subwoofer, the bass manager directs the LFE channel to the main speakers. This is the only time the LFE channel would not be sent to the subwoofer. The key concept is that the LFE channel is not the subwoofer channel.

A typical configuration of a bass-managed 5.1-channel surround-sound loudspeaker system is shown in the first diagram.

As shown in the bass management block diagram, a 5.1-channel audio system consists of five discrete, full-range main channels (front left, center, front right, surround left, and surround right), plus a band-limited low-frequency effects (LFE) channel for added bass (this corresponds to the .1). In such a system, the use of bass management allows the redirection of low-frequency signals from any of the five main speakers to the subwoofer (SW). 

The high-pass filters applied to each of the main channels are typically 12 dB/octave and use a Butterworth filter. These are complemented by a 24 dB/octave low-pass filter in the subwoofer feed, which typically uses a Linkwitz-Riley filter topology. This approach tries to take into account the natural low-frequency responses of the main speakers, which roll off at 12 dB/octave for sealed enclosures, and 18–24 dB/octave for vented enclosures. The aim is to have the low-pass filtered and high-pass filtered signals be −6 dB at the crossover frequency, producing what is known as an acoustical 4th-order Linkwitz-Riley alignment of reasonable accuracy. This helps to ensure that the low-frequency response of each of the main channels is extended downwards with a flat acoustical response. In the diagram, a 60 Hz crossover frequency has been illustrated, but this can typically vary between 40 Hz and 80 Hz. 

The LFE channel is a separate channel that contains low frequencies only, and it was originally added to magnetic 70mm-movie soundtracks in the 1970s, to be reproduced through subwoofers. It is designed to be amplified by 10 dB on playback and summed into the signal going to the subwoofer. The LFE channel for movies has a frequency range extending to 120 Hz, and some AV receivers apply a 120-Hz low-pass filter during playback, and this frequency is independent of the settings of the low-pass and high-pass filters that are applied to the main speakers. As some less expensive AV receivers offer only a fixed bass-management crossover frequency (often at 80 Hz) using one filter, Dolby 5.1-channel music mixing guidelines recommend that the LFE channel be rolled off at 80 Hz, otherwise frequency content between 80 Hz and 120 Hz could be lost.

References 

Sound production technology
Film sound production